Litter consists of waste products that have been discarded incorrectly, without consent, at an unsuitable location.  The word litter can also be used as a verb; to litter means to drop and leave objects, often man-made, such as aluminum cans, paper cups, food wrappers, cardboard boxes or plastic bottles on the ground, and leave them there indefinitely or for other people to dispose of as opposed to disposing of them correctly.

Large and hazardous items of rubbish such as tires, electrical appliances, electronics, batteries and large industrial containers are sometimes dumped in isolated locations, such as national forests and other public lands.

It is a type of human impact on the environment and remains a serious environmental problem in many countries. Litter can exist in the environment for long periods of time before decomposition and be transported over large distances into the world's oceans. Litter can affect the quality of life.

Cigarette butts are the most littered item in the world, with 4.5 trillion discarded each year. Estimates on the required time for cigarette butts to break down vary, ranging from five to four hundred years for complete degradation.

Causes

In addition to intentional littering, almost half of litter on U.S. roadways is now accidental or unintentional litter, usually debris that falls off improperly secured trash, recycling collection vehicles and pickup trucks. Population levels, traffic density and proximity to waste disposal sites are factors known to correlate with higher litter rates.

Illegally dumped hazardous waste may be a result of the costs of dropping materials at designated sites: some of these charge a fee for depositing hazardous material. Lack of access to nearby facilities that accept hazardous waste may deter use. Additionally, ignorance of the laws that regulate the proper disposal of hazardous waste may cause improper disposal.

According to a study by the Dutch organization VROM, 80% of people claim that "everybody leaves a piece of paper, tin or something, on the street behind". Young people from 12 to 24 years cause more litter than the average (Dutch or Belgian) person; only 18% of people who regularly cause litter were 50 years of age or older. However, a 2010 survey of littering in Maine, New Hampshire and Vermont in the United States, placed litterers aged 55 and over at less than 5%. The same observational study estimated that 78% of litterers are male. Litter organizations, such as Keep America Beautiful affiliates, Keep Northern Ireland Beautiful, and the Bay Area Stormwater Management Agencies Association, have focused educational efforts on youth littering.  
Negligent or lenient law enforcement contributes to littering behavior. Other causes are inconvenience, entitlement and economic conditions. A survey of dumping in Pennsylvania found that the largest number of illegal dumps were in townships without municipal trash hauling. The same report also cites unavailability of curbside trash and recycling service, shortage of enforcement, and habit as possible causes. The presence of litter invites more littering.

Two-stage process model
The two-stage process model of littering behavior describes the different ways in which people litter. The model was proposed by Chris Sibley and James Liu and differentiates between two types of littering: active and passive.

The theory has implications for understanding the different types of litter reduction interventions that will most effectively reduce littering in a given environment. The theory states that, all things being equal, passive littering will be more resistant to change because of two psychological processes: 1. diffusion of responsibility that increases as the latency between when an individual places litter in the environment and when they vacate the territory, and 2. forgetting, which is also more likely to occur at longer delays between when an individual places litter in the environment and when they vacate the territory.

Life cycle
Litter can remain visible for extended periods of time before it eventually biodegrades, with some items made of condensed glass, styrofoam or plastic possibly remaining in the environment for over a million years.

About 18 percent of litter, usually traveling through stormwater systems, ends up in local streams, rivers, and waterways. Uncollected litter can accrete and flow into streams, local bays and estuaries. Litter in the ocean either washes up on beaches or collects in ocean gyres such as the Great Pacific Garbage Patch. About 80 percent of marine debris comes from land-based sources.

Some litter that is collected can be recycled, however degraded litter cannot be recycled and eventually degrades to sludge, often toxic. The majority of litter that is collected goes to landfills.

Effects
Litter can have a detrimental impact on humans and the environment in different ways.

Effects on humans

Hazardous materials encapsulated within tires and other items of illegally dumped rubbish can leach into water sources, contaminate the soil and pollute the air.

Tires are the most often dumped hazardous waste. In 2007 the United States generated 262 million scrap tires. Thirty-eight states have laws that ban whole tires being deposited in landfills. Many of these discarded tires end up illegally dumped on public lands. Tires can become a breeding ground for insect vectors which can transmit disease to humans. Mosquitoes, which breed in stagnant water, can transmit West Nile virus and malaria. Rodents nest in accumulated tires and can transmit diseases such as Hantavirus.

When tires are burned, they can smolder for long periods of time, emitting hundreds of chemical compounds that pollute the air causing respiratory illnesses. Additionally the residue left behind can harm the soil and leach into groundwater.

Visual pollution is a major effect of litter.

Open containers such as paper cups, cardboard food packets, plastic drink bottles and aluminum drinks cans get filled up with rainwater, providing breeding locations for mosquitoes. In addition, a spark or a lightning flash can start a fire if it strikes litter such as a paper bag or cardboard box.

Litter can be hazardous to health. Debris falling from vehicles is an increasing cause of automobile accidents. Discarded dangerous goods, chemicals, tires, sharps waste and pathogens resulting from litter can cause accidental harm to humans.

Litter also carries substantial cost to the economy. Cleaning up litter in the US costs hundreds of dollars per ton, about ten times more than the cost of trash disposal, with a cost totaling about $11 billion per year.

Effects on wildlife

Animals may get trapped or poisoned with litter in their habitats. Cigarette butts and filters are a threat to wildlife and have been found in the stomachs of fish, birds and whales, who have mistaken them for food. Also, animals can get trapped in the rubbish and be in serious discomfort. For example, the plastic used to hold beverage cans together can get wrapped around animals' necks and cause them to suffocate as they grow. Other instances where animals could be harmed by litter include broken glass lacerating the paws of dogs, cats, and other small mammals.

Other effects
Organic litter in large amounts can cause water pollution and lead to algal blooms. Cigarettes could also start fires if they are not put out and then discarded in the environment.

Extent
Litter is an environmental concern in many countries around the world. While countries in the developing world lack the resources to deal with the issue, consumer based economies in the western world are capable of generating larger quantities of litter per capita due to a higher consumption of disposable products.

Branded litter
A number of credible studies have shown that fast food packaging is one of the most common forms of litter, while McDonald's is the most common brand of litter, despite having messages to dispose of properly, such as the Ronald McDonald "tidy man" marking. According to Keep Britain Tidy in 2013, Cadbury chocolate wrappers, Walkers crisp packets and Coca-Cola cans were the three top brands that were the most common pieces of rubbish found in UK streets.

Solutions

Litter bins

Public waste containers or street bins are provided by local authorities to be used as a convenient place for the disposal and collection of litter. Increasingly both general waste and recycling options are provided. Local councils collect the waste and take it for reuse or recycling. However, there are some problems with this approach; if the bins are not emptied regularly, then the bins will overflow and can increase litter indirectly. Some local authorities will only take responsibility for rubbish that is placed in the bins, which means that litter remains a problem. People may blame a lack of well-placed bins for their littering. Hazardous materials may often be incorrectly disposed of in the bins and they can encourage dumpster diving.

Cleanup

Volunteers, sometimes alone or coordinated through organizations, pick up litter and dispose of it. Clean up events may be organized in which participants will sometimes comb an area in a line to ensure that no litter is missed. Organizations may promote litter cleanup events and may also have separate media campaigns to prevent littering.

In North America, Adopt a Highway programs are popular, in which companies and organizations commit to cleaning stretches of road. Keep America Beautiful has held litter cleanups called the Great America Cleanup since 1998 in over 20,000 communities nationwide.

Earth Day cleanups have been held globally since 1970. In 2019, Earth Day Network partnered with Keep America Beautiful and National Cleanup Day for the inaugural nationwide Earth Day CleanUp. Cleanups were held in all 50 States, 5 US Territories, 5,300 sites and had more than 500,000 volunteers.

Commercial properties such as retail, office and industrial have litter picking maintenance programs. This service may be provided by property owners or contracted to various service providers by property management companies acting on owner's behalf. Litter picking is performed on foot using simple hand tools. A worker will walk the sidewalks, parking lot and landscape and sweep up litter material into a litter collection tool. Contents are emptied into a waste bin on job site.

In Kiwayu, a Kenyan island, some of the collected litter (flip-flops) is used to make art, which is then sold.

Litter traps

Litter traps can be used to capture litter as it exits stormwater drains into waterways. However, litter traps are only effective for large or floating items of litter and must be maintained. A recent watershed litter survey showed a difference in the composition of street litter and stormwater litter.

Monitoring dumping sites
Increasingly, there have been efforts to use technology to monitor areas prone to dumping. In Japan, a study used Geographic Information Systems (GIS) to map areas of dumping based on site characteristics.
Another study used satellite images to detect possible illegal dumping sites.

Container deposit legislation
Container deposit legislation can be aimed at both reducing littering and also encouraging picking up through local recycling programs that offer incentives, particularly for aluminium cans, glass bottles and plastic bottles. In New York, an expanded bottle bill that included plastic water bottles increased recycling rates and generated 120 million dollars in revenue to the state General Fund from unclaimed deposits in 2010.

In some countries such as Germany and the Netherlands, container-deposit legislation has been introduced on cans and plastic bottles. Parts of Belgium are also considering adopting such legislation. People can thus collect refund value money from this type of waste. The result of this is that in Germany, hardly any cans or plastic bottles can still be found along the road. In the Netherlands, the amount of litter has dropped considerably since the new law was implemented, and 95% of the plastic bottles are now recycled. According to Chris Snick, the revenue that can be obtained from waste picking can be financially profitable in countries where container deposit legislation has been introduced: in 1 hour he managed to pick up 108 cans and 31 plastic bottles, earning him 13.90 euro (€0.10 per can/plastic bottle). By comparison, in countries where only the value of the aluminum for example would be refunded, 139 cans would yield only 1.72 euro (0.0124 euro per can; assuming there is 15 grams of aluminum in a can, and with scrap aluminum valued at 0.8267 euro/kg).

Fines

Some countries and local authorities have introduced legislation to address the problem.

Actions resulting in fines can include on-the-spot fines for individuals administered by authorised officers in public or on public transport or littering from a vehicle, in which the vehicle owner is fined - reported by either responsible officer or third party, sometimes online.

Specific legislation exists in the following countries:
United States - punishable by a minimum fine of $200 and a maximum fine of $1,000 or even more in some states for a first offence, community service, or both, as set out by state statutes and city ordinances. All 50 states have anti-litter laws, with various fines, community service, and/or imprisonment as possible punishment.
United Kingdom - Leaving litter is an offence under the Environmental Protection Act 1990. This was extended by the Clean Neighbourhoods and Environment Act 2005 under section 18. It carries a maximum penalty of £2500 upon conviction. However, many local authorities issue fixed penalty notices under section 88 of the Environmental Protection Act 1990. Often incorrectly known as "on the spot fines", they do not have to be issued on the spot. Nor are they a fine. If an alleged offender does not want to pay a fixed penalty notice, he can have the case heard in the Magistrates Court.
Australia - no national legislation, although state based environmental protection authorities have laws and fines to discourage littering.
The Netherlands - Dutch police and local supervisors (known as buitengewoon opsporingsambtenaar, or BOA) fine citizens for throwing away cans, bottles or wrappers on the street.
Switzerland - dumping refuse and household waste inappropriately or illegally incurs a heavy fine.

Anti-litter campaigns

Many groups exist with the aim of raising awareness and run campaigns including clean up events. World Cleanup Day is a worldwide campaign. TrashTag and Plogging are examples of individual scale litter movements.

In the United States there are a number of organizations running anti-litter campaigns. Keep America Beautiful was founded in 1953, and promulgated the word litterbug, coined by its partner the Ad Council in 1947. At least 38 states have high profile, government-recognized slogan campaigns, including Don't Mess with Texas; Let's Pick It Up New York; Don't Trash California; Take Pride in Florida; Keep Iowa Beautiful. National CleanUp Day is held annually on the Third Saturday in September.

In Australia, Clean Up Australia Day is supported by many major Australian companies, firms and volunteers alike. Anti-litter organizations include "Keep Australia Beautiful", founded in 1963. It created the popular "Do the Right Thing" campaign and its Tidy Towns competition became well known being a very competitive expression of civic pride.

Keep Britain Tidy is a British campaign run by the Keep Britain Tidy environmental charity, which is part funded by the UK government.

History
Throughout human history, people have disposed of unwanted materials onto streets, roadsides, in small local dumps or often in remote locations. Prior to reforms within cities in the mid-to-late 19th century, sanitation was not a government priority. The growing piles of waste led to the spread of disease.

Anti-littering legislation seems to have existed in ancient Greece, as is evidenced by a road marker discovered on the island of Paros, bearing the inscription "whoever drops their litter on the street owes 51 drachmae to whoever wishes to claim them".

To address the growing amount of waste generated in the United States, the Solid Waste Disposal Act of 1965 was enacted. In 1976 the Federal government amended the Solid Waste Disposal Act, creating the Resource Conservation and Recovery Act (RCRA), which requires a "cradle to grave" approach to the proper handling of potentially hazardous materials. RCRA gives authority to the Environmental Protection Agency (EPA) to regulate and enforce proper hazardous waste disposal.
Many countries now have laws that require that household hazardous waste be deposited in a special location rather than sent to landfills with regular refuse. Household hazardous waste includes paints and solvents, chemicals, light bulbs, fluorescent lights, spray cans, disposable batteries, and yard products such as fertilizers, pesticides, herbicides and insecticides. Additionally, medical waste generated at home is considered a hazardous waste and must be disposed of properly.

See also

Citizen Science, citizen cleanup projects
Cleaning
Earth Day
Illegal dumping
List of environmental issues
Litter in Australia
Litter in the Netherlands
Litter in New Zealand
Litter in the United Kingdom
Litter in the United States
National Cleanup Day
Plogging
Road debris
Spitting
Throwaway society
TrashTag
World Cleanup Day

References

External links
News related to litter and cleanups

 
Sanitation